RFA Wave Sovereign (A211) was a Wave-class fleet support tanker of the Royal Fleet Auxiliary and was built at Haverton Hill by the Furness Shipbuilding Company.

On 8 December 1948, Wave Sovereign was in collision with the destroyer  while refuelling Corunna. She was extensively modified in the early 1960s.

She was decommissioned in 1966 and laid up at Singapore. Wave Sovereign was scrapped there in May 1967.

References

 

Wave-class oilers
Tankers of the Royal Fleet Auxiliary
1945 ships
Ships built on the River Tees